Mathias Hebo Rasmussen (born 2 August 1995) is a Danish professional footballer who plays as a midfielder for Polish club Cracovia.

Club career

Nordsjælland
In the summer 2014, Hebo was one out of six under-19 players, who permanently was promoted to the first team squad.

On 24 September 2014, he made his first team debut for FCN, when he played in a Danish Cup match against SC Egedal, who FCN lost 4–5. He debuted in the Danish league, in a match against Randers FC on 5 October 2014, replacing Mario Ticinovic in the 79th minute. In February 2015, his contract was extended until the summer 2016.

On 1 February 2016, FCN confirmed, that they had terminated Hebo's contract, because he had a deal with another unnamed club.

Fredericia
Just one day after his contract was terminated, 2 February 2016, Hebo signed with Danish 1st Division club FC Fredericia. Having finished the season with 30 league games and seven goals, he left the club.

Lyngby
On 17 June 2017, it was confirmed, that Hebo had signed a three-year contract with Lyngby Boldklub.

Vejle
In January 2019 Hebo signed with Vejle BK on a 3.5-year contract. Vejle was relegated to the Danish 1st Division for the 2019–20 season and on 27 August 2019, Hebo was loaned out to newly promoted Danish Superliga club Silkeborg IF for the rest of 2019.

Return to Lyngby
On 6 January 2020 it was confirmed, that Hebo had returned to Lyngby Boldklub on a 3,5-year contract. He suffered relegation to the Danish 1st Division with the club on 9 May 2021 after a loss to last placed AC Horsens.

Cracovia
On 11 June 2021, Hebo was sold to Polish Ekstraklasa club Cracovia, signing a three-year deal.

References

External links
 
 Mathias Hebo on DBU 

1995 births
Living people
Association football midfielders
Danish men's footballers
Danish expatriate men's footballers
Denmark youth international footballers
Footballers at the 2016 Summer Olympics
Olympic footballers of Denmark
People from Hvidovre Municipality
Danish Superliga players
Danish 1st Division players
Ekstraklasa players
III liga players
FC Nordsjælland players
FC Fredericia players
Lyngby Boldklub players
Vejle Boldklub players
Silkeborg IF players
MKS Cracovia (football) players
Danish expatriate sportspeople in Poland
Expatriate footballers in Poland
Hvidovre IF players
Sportspeople from the Capital Region of Denmark